The Faison Firehouse Theater is a theater in Harlem, New York founded in 1999 by Tony award winning choreographer George Faison and Tad Schnugg. It is operated by the American Performing Arts Collaborative (APAC), a not-for-profit (501c3) founded in 1997.

History

The Beaux Arts firehouse was completed in 1909, and was designed by Philadelphia architect, Howard E. Constable, (known for his design of the Shamokin Station of the Philadelphia and Reading Railroad) to house the Hook and Ladder Company 40. On August 23, 1908, the New York Tribune mentioned the planned firehouse, estimating the cost to be around $40,000 and describing a façade of "ornamental limestone lighted by large mullion bays.” The building is a small reflection of the City Beautiful movement to promote high standards of civic life.

Faison purchased the abandoned firehouse on Hancock Place (one block south of 125th Street) in 1999 and renovated it in several stages.  In its present configuration, the building features a 350-seat auditorium, a café, dance and rehearsal space, and a recording studio.  The theater is notable for a unique diagonal aisle.

The official inaugural performance at the Faison Firehouse in Fall 2007 featured a presentation by the late author and artist, Maya Angelou, in addition to professional music and dance performances and a performance by APAC youth.

Since 2007, the theater's spaces have hosted music, theater, dance and art exhibitions. The theater has presented performances by the Center for Contemporary Opera and is a regular venue for Harlem Opera Theater.

In 2018 the building was put on the market and the future of the theater is currently unknown.

References

External links

 Official website

Harlem
Government buildings completed in 1909
1909 establishments in New York City
Defunct Theatre companies in New York City